NPO Molniya (lightning) is a Russian scientific and production enterprise, founded on February 26, 1976. Currently part of Rostec.

Space systems
At present, NPO Molniya is working on reusable launch systems for space applications.

Aircraft

The NPO Molniya Molniya-1 is a three surface design with single pusher propeller and twin tail booms.
In the late 1990s, the company proposed a number of larger types based on the three surface configuration.

Molniya 400 - a proposed jet cargo aircraft or airliner with a high-mounted wing and powered by two PS-90A turbofans. Freighter version would have had a rear fuselage ramp.
Molniya-1000 Heracles - a proposed super heavy freighter to replace the VM-T Atlant and An-225 as a space load carrier. Unusual twin open fuselage design with the shuttle or other payload carried between the fuselages. A high mounted wing with six turbofan engines was proposed, it would have been capable of carrying a 450,000 kg load. Displayed as model at the 2003 Paris Air Show

Products

Aircraft
NPO Molniya Molniya-1

Manned Spacecraft
Buran spacecraft

See also 
 Gleb Lozino-Lozinskiy, lead developer of Buran, General Director of NPO Molniya

References

External links 
 Official website  or 
 Official website 
 NPO Molniya at Buran.ru (in English).

Soviet and Russian space institutions
Aerospace companies of the Soviet Union
Space industry companies of Russia
Rostec
Companies based in Moscow